Branko Hrg (26 September 1961) is a Croatian politician and former leader of the Croatian Peasant Party (HSS). He was a member of HSS from 1992 to 2016 and serves as a mayor of Križevci since 2001.

In January 2012 intra-party elections, Hrg beat former Croatian Minister of Tourism Damir Bajs with 555 votes over 374.

On March 19 2016 he lost, with 188 votes, in the first round of intra-party elections, against Krešo Beljak who got 339 votes and Nenad Matić who got 225 votes, making him no longer the President of HSS.

References 

1961 births
Living people
Croatian Peasant Party politicians
Representatives in the modern Croatian Parliament